Uromenus rugosicollis is the type species in its genus of bush crickets, belonging to the subfamily Bradyporinae. It is found in Spain and the Pyrenees to southern France.

References

External links
 
 Orthoptera Species File

Orthoptera of Europe
Tettigoniidae